On 9 September 1974, the West Ridge Direct on Mount Everest was attempted by a French expedition. It resulted in the deaths of six climbers in an avalanche on the way to the summit. These deaths took the total number of fatalities on the mountain to 36.

The team consisted of:
 
 
 Claude Ancey (survived)
 Lhakpa (Sherpa)
 Sanu Wongal (Sherpa)
 Pemba Dorje (Sherpa)
 Nawang Lutuk (Sherpa)
 Nima Wangchu (Sherpa)

In comparison, six Sherpas died on 5 April 1970 due to an avalanche in the Khumbu Icefall (see 1970 Mount Everest disaster). Other bad years were 1982 and 1996, although none of these years claimed as many lives as were lost in the avalanches of 2014 and 2015.

See also
 1970 Mount Everest disaster
 List of 20th-century summiters of Mount Everest
 List of deaths on the Eight Thousanders
 List of people who died climbing Mount Everest
 List of Mount Everest expeditions

References

External links
 Broadcast of the National Institute of Audiovisuel
 Article of Claude Ancey death on the blog of the guide company of Chamonix 

1974
1970s avalanches
Expeditions from France
Mountaineering disasters
1974 disasters in Asia
1974 in Nepal
Avalanches in Nepal
September 1974 events in Asia
1974 disasters in Nepal

Gerard Devouassoux